Surakksha (English: Protection) is a 1979 Hindi- language film directed by Ravikant Nagaich. The film stars Mithun Chakraborty, Ranjeeta, Jeevan, Jagdeep, Iftekhar, and Aruna Irani. Based as a spy thriller (with hero's code of Gunmaster G9), it was the first of a two of such films with Mithun in the lead, the other being Wardat.  It was a "Super-duper Hit" film at the box office and the ninth highest grossing movie of 1979. The film is only big success in the year 1979, where big stars films were failed or just a moderate success but Surakksha is a huge hit of 1979, and Mithun Chakraborty becomes a rising star.

Plot
Shiv Shakti Organization (SSO) intends to spread terror in India. The CBI Chief (Iftekhar) learns about this and calls for Officer Gopi (Mithun), aka Gunmaster G-9, to investigate into the matter. The trouble starts when a plane flown by Captain Kapoor (Suresh Oberoi) is attacked by a stream of deadly signals force landing it. Soon after, agent Jackson (Tej Sapru) is replaced with his look-alike. Gopi doesn't take long to get to this and sets out to rescue his agent. During this, he happens to encounter Priya (Ranjeeta), who's out to investigate her father's death, supposedly by Gopi. After a few chance encounters, both start to check about the organisation and its high command. Further course of investigation leads them to the Hiralal (Jeevan) working with his men using hi-tech gadgets for this organisation. After few interesting stunts, car-chases, fights, dancing with scantily-clad girls, some romance and comedy by agent Khabri (Jagdeep), they happen to meet the patchy-eyed SSO chief, Doctor Shiva (K. Balaji). The rest of the story show on handling this chief and his organization by the CBI.

Cast
Mithun Chakraborty as CBI Officer Gopi/Gunmaster G-9
Ranjeeta as Priya
Jeevan as Hiralal
Jagdeep as Khabari
Iftakar as CBI Head
Aruna Irani as Ruby
Prema Narayan as Maggie
Tej Sapru as Jackson 'Jackie'
Balaje as Doctor Shiva, SSO Chief
Mala Jaggi as Neelam
Suresh Oberoi as Captain Kapoor

Crew
Direction – Raveekant Nagaich
Story – Rajvansh
Screenplay – Ramesh Pant
Dialogue – V.D. Puranik
Production – B. Subaash, Raveekant Nagaich
Production Company – Gopi Enterprises
Editing – Shyam Mukherjee
Cinematography – Raveekant Nagaich
Music Direction – Bappi Lahiri
Lyrics – Faruk Kaiser, Ramesh Pant
Playback – Annette Pinto, Bappi Lahiri, Dilraj Kaur, Kishore Kumar, Lata Mangeshkar, Manna Dey, Usha Mangeshkar

Soundtrack

References

External links 
 
 सुरक्षा on Bollywood Hungama

1979 films
1970s spy films
1970s Hindi-language films
Films scored by Bappi Lahiri
Indian spy thriller films
Films directed by Ravikant Nagaich